1970 was a year of the Gregorian calendar.

1970 may also refer to:

"19

70" (Boris song)
"1970" (The Stooges song), also known as "I Feel Alright", from the album Fun House
MCMLXX (album) an album by Ray Bryant